Four ships of the Royal Navy have borne the name HMS Cockchafer after the insect, the cockchafer:

 , of five guns, was formerly the United States schooner Spencer, that the Royal Navy captured and employed as a ship's tender. She captured two American armed brigs, one in a single-ship action. The Royal Navy sold her in 1815.
  was an  wooden screw gunboat launched in 1855 and sold in 1872.
  was a  composite screw gunboat launched in 1881 and sold in 1905.
  was an  gunboat launched in 1915, hulked in 1947 and sold in 1949.

See also
 was an 8-gun lugger hired in 1794 that foundered in 1801.



Royal Navy ship names